Aaseya Bale is a 1987 Indian Kannada drama film, directed by Raj Kishor. The film featured Vishnuvardhan, Nalini and Jai Jagadish in pivotal roles. The music was composed by Vijaya Bhaskar, to the lyrics of Chi. Udaya Shankar and R. N. Jayagopal.

The film, produced by SS Productions, was a remake of the Hindi film Do Anjaane (1976) which was based on the Bengali novel Ratrir Yatri by Nihar Ranjan Gupta.

Cast 
Vishnuvardhan
Nalini
Jai Jagadish
Lokanath
Dinesh
Seetharam
Lakshman
Shanthamma
Umesh
Saikumar
Master Nirmal
Master Arjun

Soundtrack 

Vijaya Bhaskar composed the soundtrack. The album consists of five tracks.

References

External links 

1987 films
1980s Kannada-language films
Indian drama films
Kannada remakes of Hindi films
Films scored by Vijaya Bhaskar
1987 drama films
Films based on works by Nihar Ranjan Gupta